This is a list of the Australian moth species of the family Herminiidae. It also acts as an index to the species articles and forms part of the full list of moths of Australia.

Adrapsa ablualis Walker, 1859
Auchmophanes megalosara (Turner, 1909)
Auchmophanes ochrospila Turner, 1908
Auchmophanes platysara (Turner, 1929)
Bocana manifestalis Walker, 1859
Corethrobela melanophaes Turner, 1908
Hydrillodes dimissalis (Walker, 1866)
Hydrillodes funestalis (Walker, 1866)
Hydrillodes metisalis (Walker, 1859)
Lithilaria anomozancla (Turner, 1944)
Lithilaria melanostrotum (Turner, 1906)
Lithilaria ossicolor Rosenstock, 1885
Lithilaria proestans (T.P. Lucas, 1895)
Mormoscopa phricozona (Turner, 1902)
Mormoscopa sordescens (Rosenstock, 1885)
Nodaria aneliopis Turner, 1904
Nodaria cornicalis (Fabricius, 1794)
Pogonia umbrifera (T.P. Lucas, 1895)
Polypogon fractalis (Guenée, 1854)
Simplicia armatalis (Walker, 1866)
Simplicia caeneusalis (Walker, 1859)
Simplicia erebina (Butler, 1887)
Simplicia rufa A.E. Prout, 1929
Squamipalpis pantoea (Turner, 1908)
Stenhypena albopunctata (Bethune-Baker, 1908)

External links 
Herminiidae at Australian Faunal Directory

Australia
Moths of Australia